Best of Benny Benassi is a Greatest Hits/Best Of album released by Euro House DJ/producer Benny Benassi in 2006. Ten of its fourteen tracks are from his debut album Hypnotica.

2006 Track listing

2007 Track listing

Disc 1

Disc 2

References

Benny Benassi albums
2006 greatest hits albums